Mamvu is a Central Sudanic language of northeastern Congo. It is quite similar to Lese.

Mamvu is spoken in Watsa Territory.

Phonology
Mamvu has a doubly articulated [q͡p]

References

Central Sudanic languages